The 1988 Virginia Slims of Houston was a women's tennis tournament played on outdoor clay courts at the Westside Tennis Club in Houston, Texas in the United States and was part of the Category 4 tier of the 1988 WTA Tour. It was the 18th edition of the tournament and was held from April 18 through April 24, 1988. Second-seeded Chris Evert won the singles title.

Finals

Singles

 Chris Evert defeated  Martina Navratilova 6–0, 6–4
 It was Evert's 2nd singles title of the year and the 155th of her career.

Doubles

 Katrina Adams /  Zina Garrison defeated  Lori McNeil /  Martina Navratilova 6–7(4–7), 6–2, 6–4
 It was Adams' 2nd title of the year and the 3rd of her career. It was Garrison's 3rd title of the year and the 13th of her career.

See also
 Evert–Navratilova rivalry

References

External links
 ITF tournament edition details
 Tournament draws

Virginia Slims of Houston
Virginia Slims of Houston
Virginia Slims of Houston
Virginia Slims of Houston
Virginia Slims of Houston
Virginia Slims of Houston